PixelJunk 4am, formerly called PixelJunk Lifelike, is a music video game and music visualizer developed by Q-Games. It is part of the PixelJunk series of downloadable games for the PlayStation 3. PixelJunk 4am makes use of the PlayStation Move controller to visualize included music (by Baiyon) and users' own music. The first trailer was released in September 2010.

Reception

PixelJunk 4am received "mixed" reviews according to the review aggregation website Metacritic.

References

External links
 PixelJunk 4am's Official website

2012 video games
Music video games
PlayStation Network games
PlayStation 3 games
PlayStation 3-only games
PlayStation Move-compatible games
Sony Interactive Entertainment games
Video games developed in Japan
Q-Games games